Hugh Lawrence Gaffney (born 10 August 1963) is a Scottish Labour politician who served as the Member of Parliament (MP) for Coatbridge, Chryston and Bellshill from 2017 to 2019. He was a Member of North Lanarkshire Council from 2017 to 2019.

Early life
Gaffney was raised in Uddingston, South Lanarkshire; he has three brothers and two sisters. He is married and has three sons. Since he was in his twenties, until being elected, Gaffney worked for Royal Mail and Parcelforce, and wore his former work uniform to Westminster on his first day in the House of Commons.

Political career
Gaffney was elected to the North Lanarkshire Council in 2017, representing the Thorniewood ward. In the 2017 general election, he stood as the Labour candidate for Coatbridge, Chryston and Bellshill, defeating the incumbent Scottish National Party MP Phil Boswell.

In the 2017 Scottish Labour leadership election, Gaffney supported Richard Leonard to succeed Kezia Dugdale to be Scottish Labour leader over the alternative candidate Anas Sarwar; Gaffney's own Constituency Labour Party (CLP) took a firm stance on supporting Leonard's campaign. 
 
In January 2018, Gaffney made jokes at a Labour Students Burns supper in which he used the phrases "bent" to describe gay people and "chinky" to describe Chinese food. He was not suspended from the Labour Party but instead given mandatory equality and diversity training. He later also apologised for the jokes.

Gaffney resigned as a councillor in North Lanarkshire Council in July 2019, triggering a council by-election. In his resignation letter to the council's chief executive, Gaffney said he had been privileged to serve the community into which he had been born and bred.

In the general election of December 2019, he was defeated by Steven Bonnar of the SNP.

Personal life
In 2010 Gaffney was one of the founding members of the Keir Hardie Society, alongside Scottish author and longtime Labour member Bob Holman and former Scottish Labour leader Richard Leonard, with whom Gaffney has been friends since the 1990s. Gaffney supports Albion Rovers Football Club.

References

External links

Living people
Scottish Labour MPs
UK MPs 2017–2019
Scottish Labour councillors
1963 births
People from Uddingston
Royal Mail people
Councillors in North Lanarkshire
Politicians from South Lanarkshire